The Baltimore Orioles were a minor league ice hockey team that operated out of Carlin's Iceland from 1932 until 1942. The team was Baltimore's first professional hockey club. The Orioles played in the Tri-State Hockey League during the 1932–33 season. In 1933, the Orioles joined the Eastern Amateur Hockey League and remained there until 1942. The Orioles were coached by Billy Boyd (1933–35), Gord Fraser (1935–36), Bill Hines (1938–41), and Elmer Piper (1941–42). The Orioles won the EAHL championship in the 1939–40 season. The team disbanded in 1942, when it lost players to enlistment for service in World War II. The Orioles' EAHL replacement in Baltimore were the United States Coast Guard Cutters, a team made of enlisted sailors.

Players
Notable league executive Jack Riley played for the Orioles from 1938 to 1942. Eleven Orioles also played in the National Hockey League.

Clarence Behling
Norm Calladine
Ab DeMarco
Bob Dill
Jack Dyte
George Grigor
Fred Hunt
Bill Moe
Joe Papike
Aud Tuten
Chick Webster

Results
Season-by-season results:

References

Defunct ice hockey teams in the United States
Eastern Hockey League teams
Ice hockey teams in Maryland
Ice hockey clubs established in 1932
Sports clubs disestablished in 1942
Sports teams in Baltimore
1932 establishments in Maryland
1942 disestablishments in Maryland